Jennie Fletcher (19 March 1890 – 17 January 1968), later known by her married name Jennie Hyslop, was a British competitive swimmer, Olympic gold medallist, and former world record-holder.  In 1905 she set a new world record in the 100-yard freestyle that stood for seven years. She was selected for the 1908 Olympics, but the women's swimming events were cancelled due to a shortage of participants.  At the 1912 Summer Olympics, she won a gold medal in the 4×100-metre freestyle relay and a bronze medal in the individual 100-metre freestyle race.  In 1971 she was inducted to the International Swimming Hall of Fame as an "Honor Swimmer".

Fletcher was born in an underprivileged family of 11 siblings and had to combine swimming with daily 12-hour work.  In 1913 she began teaching swimming in Leicester, which ended her competitive career as she turned from an amateur into a professional. In 1917, she married and immigrated to Canada, where she gave birth to a daughter and five sons.

See also
 List of members of the International Swimming Hall of Fame
 List of Olympic medalists in swimming (women)
 World record progression 4 × 100 metres freestyle relay

References

External links

 
 
 

1890 births
1968 deaths
British female freestyle swimmers
British female swimmers
English female water polo players
Olympic swimmers of Great Britain
Swimmers at the 1912 Summer Olympics
English Olympic medallists
Olympic gold medallists for Great Britain
Olympic bronze medallists for Great Britain
World record setters in swimming
Olympic bronze medalists in swimming
Medalists at the 1912 Summer Olympics
English emigrants to Canada
Olympic gold medalists in swimming
People from Belgrave, Leicester